William Lovelace was a physician.

William Lovelace may also refer to:

William Lovelace (MP) (died 1577), English politician and lawyer
William Lovelace, of the American Harp Society